The 75th Flying Training Wing was a flying training wing of the United States Army Air Forces. At the time, a wing controlled several multi-squadron groups.  It was last assigned to the Army Air Forces Flying Training Command, and was disbanded on 15 June 1946 at Buckingham Army Airfield, Florida.

There is no lineage between the United States Air Force 75th Air Base Wing, established on 5 February 1942 as the 75th Observation Group at Ellington Field, Texas and this organization.

History
The wing was a World War II Command and Control organization, initially part of Eastern Flying Training Command.  The mission of the wing was to train aerial gunners.   Fixed gunnery training for air cadet pilots was carried out at Eglin Army Airfield, while flexible gunnery training for enlisted gunners was carried out both at Tyndall Army Airfield in northern Florida and Buckingham Army Airfield in Southwest Florida.    As the men graduated from flexible gunnery school, they were assigned to combat crews either forming in the United States or as replacements to overseas combat units.

As training requirements changed during the war, schools were activated and inactivated or transferred to meet those requirements.

Lineage
 Established as 75th Flying Training Wing, on 14 August 1943
 Activated on 25 August 1943
 Disbanded on 16 June 1946.

Assignments
 Army Air Forces Eastern Flying Training Command, 25 August 1943
 AAF Western Flying Training Command, 15 December 1945 – 16 June 1946

Training aircraft
The schools of the wing flew two types of aircraft, gunnery trainers and gunnery targets.
 The trainer used for fixed gunnery training for pilots was the North American AT-6 Texan.
 The trainers used for flexible gunnery training for aerial gunners were the AT-18 Hudson and non-combat rated B-24 Liberators.
 Aerial gunnery target tow planes were Vultee BT-13s.
 Non-combat rated P-40s, P-39s and P-63s, modified for aerial targets, were also used.

Assigned Pilot Schools

 Apalachicola Army Airfield, Apalachicola, Florida
 AAF Flexible Gunnery School
 Opened: September 1942, Closed: October 1945 (AT-6, AT-18, BT-13)
 Operated AT-18 Hudsons for gunnery trainers; used modified AT-6s for aerial gunnery targets; Sub-base of Tyndall AAF

 Buckingham Army Airfield, Fort Myers, Florida
 AAF Flexible Gunnery School
 37th Flexible Gunnery Training Group
 Opened: March 1942, Closed: October 1945 (AT-6, AT-18, BT-13, B-24)
 Operated AT-18 Hudsons and B-24 Liberators for gunnery trainers; used modified AT-6s for aerial gunnery targets;

 Eglin Army Airfield, Valparaiso, Florida
 AAF Fixed Gunnery School
 Opened: October 1941, Closed: October 1945 (AT-6)
 Fixed gunnery school operated AT-6s; also home of Proving Ground Command; now USAF Eglin Air Force Base

 Naples Army Airfield, Naples, Florida
 714th Flexible Gunnery Training Squadron
 Opened: January 1944, Closed: August 1945 (P-40, RP-39Q RP-63)
 Sub-base of Buckingham AAF; operated modified single-engine fighters as aerial gunnery targets for flexible gunners in training at Buckingham AAF

 Tyndall Army Airfield, Panama City, Florida
 AAF Flexible Gunnery School
 37th Flexible Gunnery Training Group
 Opened: August 1941, Closed: December 1945 (AT-6, AT-18)
 Operated AT-18 Hudsons for gunnery trainers; used modified AT-6s for aerial gunnery targets; Now USAF Tyndall Air Force Base

Stations
  Buckingham Army Airfield, Florida, 25 August 1943 – 16 June 1946

References

Training wings of the United States Army Air Forces
Military units and formations established in 1943
Military units and formations disestablished in 1946